Domenico Starnone (born 15 February 1943) is an Italian writer, screenwriter and journalist.

Born in Saviano, near Naples, he has worked for several newspapers and satirical magazines, including L'Unità, Il Manifesto, Tango, and Cuore, usually about episodes of his life as a high school teacher. He also works as a screenwriter.

Movies La scuola, The Ties (both by Daniele Luchetti), Auguri Professore (by Riccardo Milani) and Denti (by Gabriele Salvatores) are based on his books.

One of his novels is Via Gemito, which won the Premio Strega in 2001.  It was suggested in 2006 that the mysterious writer Elena Ferrante, author of L'amore molesto and I giorni dell'abbandono, is Starnone himself. In a collection of interviews, the Frantumaglia: A Writer's Journey, Ferrante addresses these speculations; she writes that in relation to the speculation that Ferrante is likely to be Starnone,  due to her anonymity, and his feeling 'tired of everyone asking if he's Ferrante', she expresses 'That he's right and I feel guilty. But I hold him in great esteem and I'm certain that he understands my motivations. My identity, my sex can be found in my writing. Everything that has sprouted up around that is yet more evidence of the character of Italians in the first years of the twenty-first century.'

Starnone is married to Anita Raja, the literary translator who was said to be the author Elena Ferrante in a report by the Italian investigative journalist Claudio Gatti in 2016. In 2017 an international research compared the language of the mysterious novelist with 150 novels, revealing singular similarities with Starnone. The same research team does not rule out that Ferrante's novels are the result of the collaboration between Starnone and his wife Anita Raja.

Selected bibliography 
Ex cattedra (1987)
Il salto con le aste (1989)
Segni d'oro (1990)
Fuori registro (1991)
Sottobanco (1992)
Eccesso di zelo (1993)
Denti (1994)
 Appunti sulla maleducazione di un insegnante volenteroso (1995)
La retta via (1996)
Via Gemito (2000)
La collega Passamaglia (2001)
Alice allo Strega (2002)
Labilità (2005)
Ex cattedra e altre storie di scuola (2007)
Prima esecuzione (2007)
Spavento (2009)
Fare scene. Una storia di cinema (2010)
Autobiografia erotica di Aristide Gambìa (2011)
Lacci (Ties, 2014)
Scherzetto (Trick, 2016)
Le false resurrezioni (2018)
Confidenza (Trust, 2019)

English editions
First Execution, translated by Antony Shugaar (2009) 
Ties, translated by Jhumpa Lahiri (2017) 
Trick, translated by Jhumpa Lahiri (2018) 
Trust (also as Secrets), translated by Jhumpa Lahiri (2019)

Notes

1943 births
Living people
Italian journalists
Italian male journalists
Italian screenwriters
Italian male screenwriters
People from Saviano
Strega Prize winners